Stefano Marzo (born 22 March 1991) is a Belgian professional footballer who plays for Dender EH. He formerly played for PSV, Beerschot, Heerenveen, Lokeren and Roda JC. Born in Lommel, he is of Italian and Dutch descent.

References

External links
 Voetbal International profile 
 
 

1991 births
Living people
People from Lommel
Association football defenders
Belgian footballers
Belgian people of Italian descent
PSV Eindhoven players
Beerschot A.C. players
SC Heerenveen players
K.S.C. Lokeren Oost-Vlaanderen players
Roda JC Kerkrade players
F.C.V. Dender E.H. players
Eredivisie players
Belgian Pro League players
Belgian expatriate footballers
Belgian expatriate sportspeople in the Netherlands
Expatriate footballers in the Netherlands
Footballers from Limburg (Belgium)